Union Sportive Madinat Blida, known as USM Blida or simply USMB, is a football club based in Blida, Algeria. They currently play in the Inter-Régions Division, the third tier of Algerian football. Founded in 1932, they have played their home games at Brakni Brothers Stadium since 1936. The club has spent all of its history playing between the first or second tiers.

The club's highest-ever league finish was second in the top flight in 2002–03. They were Algerian Cup runners-up in 1996. The club have also won the second tier title four times.
   
The club's home colours are green and white, and their nickname is The Salvador.

History
On 16 June 1932 the club was officially founded with the name Union Sportive Musulmane Blidéenne, and began competing in the Third Division League Football Association of Algiers. They played their first official match on 24 September 1933 in the first round of the North African Cup.

On 5 August 2020, USM Blida was promoted to the Algerian Ligue 2.

Club identity

Colours 
Since the establishment of the club, the colours are green and white.

Crest 
Historical evolution of the club's crest.

Stadium 
USM Blida play their home matches at Brakni Brothers Stadium since 2011.

Current squad

Honours

Domestic competitions
 Algerian Ligue Professionnelle 1 : 26 season
Runner-up (1): 2002–03
 Algerian Ligue Professionnelle 2 : 25 season
Champion (4): 1971–72, 1991–92, 1996–97, 2014–15

 Algerian Cup :
Runner-up (1): 1995–96

 Honor Division of the League Algiers : 10 season
5th: 1954–55, 1955–56.
 First Division of the League Algiers : 5 season
Champion (3): 1941-42, 1944-45, 1946–47
 Second Division of the League Algiers : 1 season
Champion (1): 1937-38
 Third Division of the League Algiers : 4 season
Champion (1): 1936-37
 Forconi Cup :
Champion (1): 1944-45

Regional competitions 
 North African Cup : 5 appearances
1947 – Quarter-finals
1952 – Round of 32
1953 – Round of 32
1954 – Semi-final
1955 – Round of 32
 Arab Club Champions Cup : 2 appearances
1996 – Group stage
2004 – Second round

North African Cup

Arab Champions League

Records
 Record League victory – 9–1 v. IRB Nezla (29 May 1992)
 Record Algerian Cup victory – 11–0 v. IRC Aïn Salah (10 December 1987)
 Record League defeat – 6–2 v. JS Hai Djabel (24 January 2022)

 Most League appearances – +300, Billal Zouani (1988–08)
 Most League goals scored – 105, Billal Zouani (1988–08)
 Most goals scored (overall) – 122, Billal Zouani (1988–08)
 Most capped player – Smaïl Diss, 11 caps, Algeria
 Most goals scored in a season – 17, Samy Frioui (2017–18)
 Record transfer fee paid – €138,500 to ASO Chlef for Abdelmadjid Tahraoui (2005)
 Record transfer fee received – €400,000 from Club Africain for Ezechiel N'Douassel (2011)
 Record sequence of League wins – 12; 1 March 1992 – 19 June 1992.
 Record sequence of League defeats – 7; 3 April 2021 – 18 May 2021
 Record sequence of unbeaten League matches – 20; 1991–22, 1996–97
 Record sequence without a League win – 13; 1 January 1998 – 28 May 1998
 Record points total for a Season – 72 pts; 1963–64

Presidents

Transfers

Record sales

Record signings

List of managers 

The first manager of USM Blida was Abdelkader Hadef, who joined the club in 1932 as a player-manager. The current manager is Djilali Madjour, who took over the club in February 2022.

Recent seasons

See also 
 List of USM Blida players
 List of USM Blida seasons
 USM Blida league record by opponent
 List of USM Blida international footballers

References

External links

 
Football clubs in Algeria
Association football clubs established in 1932
Algerian Ligue Professionnelle 1 clubs
Algerian Ligue 2 clubs
1932 establishments in Algeria
USM Blida